The King's Heralds is a male gospel music quartet that began in 1927 and have recorded over 100 albums encompassing 30 languages.
They are primarily known for their a cappella singing and close harmony.

History
The King's Heralds began in 1927 by four college students; brothers Lewis, Waldo and Wesley Crane and Ray Turner (1908-2008) in Keene, Texas who began singing gospel music, under the name Lone Star Four.
They soon appeared with Pastor R. L. Benton on his radio program on KFPL from Waco, Texas.

In 1936, they were invited by H.M.S. Richards to join the Voice of Prophecy in California, and were renamed the King's Heralds after a radio naming contest. This association continued until 1982, when they became a self-supporting ministry.

The King's Heralds are also known by the name The Heralds, in Portuguese as the Arautos do Rei and in Spanish as Los Heraldos del Rey.
Purported to be the oldest continuous gospel quartet in America, they have been singing for over 80 years.

Throughout the years they have performed in over 50 countries and continue to tour extensively.
They were the first gospel music group from the West to tour The People’s Republic of China since 1949, singing for the "First Invitational Symposium on the Christian Church in China" sponsored by the US/China Education Foundation.

Long associated with the Seventh-day Adventist Voice of Prophecy radio broadcast, the Heralds are now promoted as trans-denominational and are regular guests on Praise The Lord on TBN and It Is Written.

Recordings

Most of their recordings have been released by Chapel Records.

"O Little Town of Bethlehem" (Chapel 100, 10", 1950) also on 78rpm and 45rpm set
"Favorite Hymns and Songs" (Chapel 101, 10", 1950) also on 78rpm set
"Deep River" (Chapel 102, 10", 1950)
"King's Heralds & Del Delker" (Chapel 103, 10", 1951-53?)
"Garden of Prayer" (Chapel 1211, 10", 1953)
"Old Hymns of Faith vol.1" (Chapel 1220, 10", 1953) 
"Old Hymns of Faith vol.2" (Chapel 1221, 10", 1953)
"That One Lost Sheep" (Chapel 1233, 10", 1953-54?)
"Song of Heaven & Homeland" (Chapel 1240, 10", 1954-55?)
"Jesus Is Coming Again" with Del Delker (Chapel 1509, 10", 1955)
"Radio Favorites" (Chapel 1510, 10", 1955)
"Songs for Sabbath" (Chapel 1517, 10", 1956)
"Silent Night" (Chapel 1518, 10", 1956)
"Songs of Thanksgiving" (Chapel 1526, 1956-1961?)
"The Golden Moment" (Chapel 5007, 1956-1961?)
"A Boy Named David" (Chapel 7001, 1956-1961?)
"Our Prayer" (Chapel 5012, 1957-1961?)
"Birthday of a King" (Chapel 5016, 1957-1961?)
"Out of the Deep" (Chapel 5023, 1957-1961?)
"I Believe" (Chapel 5031, 1957-1961?)
"Lost in the Night" (Chapel 5052, 1957-1961?)
"Camp-Meeting Favorites" (Chapel 5057, 1962)
"Garden of Prayer" (Chapel 5067, 1962)
"That Great Gettin'-Up Morning" (Chapel 5070, 1963)
"There's A Wideness In God's Mercy" (1963-4)
"Come Children Join To Sing" (1965)
"We'll All Praise God" with Faith For Today Quartet (1966)
"King's Heralds Favorites Through 25 Years" (1966)
"Wheel In A Wheel" (1967)
"We Worship Thee" (1968)
"Near To The Heart Of God" (1968-9)
"Precious Memories" (1970)
"Master Designer" (1971)
"Listen To The Sound" (1972)
"Amazing Grace" (1973)
"Side By Side" (1974)
"It's Spiritual" (1974)
"Yes, God Is Real" (1975)
"Acappella Again" (1976)
"Love" (1976)
"If My People" (1977)
"40th Anniversary Album" (1977)
"In Remembrance Of Me" (1978)
"Healing Love" (1979)
"Songs For Kids" (1980)
"Rainbow Album" (1980)
"Homesick For Heaven" (1981)
"Best Of Christmas" (1981)
"Don't Give Up!" (1982)
"Favorites Through The Years" (1983)
"Our Brand Of Country" (1984)
"Favorite American Folksongs" (1984)
"Another Rainbow" (1985)
"Try A Little Kindness" (1986)
"Honor The Lord" (1987)
"For All Us Kids" (1988)
"The Way We Were" (1990)
"Git'On Board" (1991)
"Homeward Bound" (1992)
"Morning Has Broken" (1993)
"Behold The Lamb" (1994)
"Be Still My Soul" (1995)
"The Heralds Christmas" (1995)
"I Need Thee Every Hour" (1996)
"70th Anniversary Album" (1998)
"Higher Ground" (2000)
"King's Heralds Reunion Concert"  (2000)
"Fireside Reunion" (2000)
"Celebrate" (2001)
"Revival" (2002)
"Delivered! Spirituals" (2002-3)
"Jerry's Farewell" (2003)
"Then & Now" (2005) Recorded at the General Conference Session in St. Louis, MO.
"Encores" with Jim Ayars (2005), with Jeff Pearles (2006)
"Anthology Volume 1" (2006)
"Anthology Volume 2" (2007)
"I Just Can't Wait!" (2007).
"Hymn Sessions" (2009) - arranged by Russell Hospedales, released at the National Quartet Convention.
"Then & Now" (2010)-recorded exclusively at the 2010 General Conference session in Atlanta, GA
"Wake Up, Church!" (2011) - released at the National Quartet Convention.
"Time's Windin' Up" (2012)
"Thy Blessed Spirit" (2014)
"Telling The World" (2016)
"Give The World A Smile" (2017)

Awards
 Recipient of twenty-three Silver Angel Awards for "Excellence in Media", including six for "Best Male Vocal Group", fourteen for "Best Album" and a "Best International Broadcast" award for their own radio program, "Sounds of Praise".
 "Gold" Angel Award for being the oldest continuous Gospel Quartet in America.

List of singers

Current singers
The quartet is currently composed of:
 Don Scroggs - 1st Tenor
 JR Rosa - 2nd Tenor
 John Watkins - Baritone
 Jeff Pearles - Bass

https://khqofficial.org/bio

Complete list of singers

Past and present singers listed alphabetically by first name, including years in the group:

 Ben Glanzer, First Tenor 1944-1948
 Ben Jenkins, Second Tenor 2017–2018
 Robert (Bob) E Edwards, First Tenor 1947-1971
 Bob Johnson, First Tenor 1939-1941
 Bob Seamount, Second Tenor 1941-1947, 1949-1961
 Don Scroggs, First Tenor 1983–Present
 Elwyn Ardourel, First Tenor 1949-1949
 Frank Dietrich, First Tenor 1947-1947, Second Tenor 1948-1948
 George Casebeer, First Tenor 1941-1944
 Gerald Fuentes, Second Tenor 2004
 Jack Veazey, Baritone 1962-1997
 Jared Otto, Second Tenor 2013–2017
 Jeff Pearles, Bass 2005–Present
 Jerry Dill, Bass 1947-1948, Baritone 1948-1949, Bass 1949-1962
 Jerry Patton, Second Tenor 1967-2004
 Jim Ayars, Bass 1977-2005
 Jim McClintock, Bass 1962-1977
 Joe Melashenko, Bass 1948-1949
 Joel Borg, Second Tenor 2004–2013
 John Ramsey, First Tenor 1971-1983
 John Thurber, Second Tenor 1961-1967
 John Watkins, Baritone 2019–Present
 Joseph Smith, Second Tenor 2022
 JR Rosa, Second Tenor 2022-Present
 Lewis Crane, First Tenor 1927-1939
 Mark Ringwelski, Second Tenor 2019–2021
 Ralph Simpson, Second Tenor 1940-1941
 Ray Turner, Bass 1927-1947
 Richard Lang, Baritone 1947-1948
 Russell Hospedales, Baritone 2002–2018
 Steve Laing, Baritone 1997-2002
 Vernon Stuart, Second Tenor 1939-1940
 Waldo Crane, Second Tenor 1927-1939
 Wayne Hooper, Baritone 1944-1947, 1949-1962
 Wesley Crane, Baritone 1927-1943

Accompanists/Arrangers
 Irving Steinel, 1937-1942
 Al Avila, 1942-1950
 Beth Thurston, 1950-1953
 Brad Braley, 1953-1972
 Calvin Taylor, 1972-1977
 Jim Teel, 1977-1989
 John Grover Lewis, 1989-1995
 Russell Hospedales, 2002–2018

Timeline

References

External links
 The King's Heralds official website
 Biographical information on members

American male singers
American gospel singers
American Seventh-day Adventists
Chapel Records artists